Achina is a village in the Dadri tehsil in the Bhiwani district of the Indian state of Haryana. Its Pin code is 127307 and postal head office is Achina. Nearby villages include Bass (2 km), Jhinjhar (4 km), Morwala (4 km), Bigowa (5 km) and Ranila (5 km).

References

Villages in Bhiwani district